The 1993 Philips Open was a men's tennis tournament played on outdoor clay courts at the Nice Lawn Tennis Club in Nice, France, and was part of the ATP World Series of the 1993 ATP Tour. It was the 22nd edition of the tournament and took place from 12 April through 18 April 1993. Qualifier Marc-Kevin Goellner won the singles title.

Finals

Singles
 Marc-Kevin Goellner defeated  Ivan Lendl 1–6, 6–4, 6–2
 It was Goellner's first singles title of his career.

Doubles
 David Macpherson /  Laurie Warder defeated  Shelby Cannon /  Scott Melville 3–4 ret

References

External links
 ITF tournament edition details

Philips Open
1993
Philips Open
Philips Open
20th century in Nice